Realm of Chaos may refer to:
 Realm of Chaos (album), or Realm of Chaos: Slaves to Darkness, an album by Bolt Thrower
Realm of Chaos (Warhammer), two books by Games Workshop for the Warhammer Fantasy Roleplay, Warhammer Fantasy Battle and Warhammer 40,000 games
The Realm of Chaos, a terrorist organization formed by American criminal Joseph Konopka
Realms of Chaos (video game), a 1995 platform game